Tempa may refer to:

Tempa, British record label

Places
Tempa, West Virginia, unincorporated community in Summers County, West Virginia, United States
Tempa, Nepal, village and Village Development Committee in Khotang District in the Sagarmatha Zone of eastern Nepal
Tempa, Estonia, village in Pühalepa Parish, Hiiu County, Estonia

People
Tempa Ndah (born 1973), Beninese football referee
Tempa Tsering (born 1950), Tibetan politician

See also
 Tampa (disambiguation)